Andrew Douglas Busby (8 December 1947 – 1 July 2022) was a Scottish footballer who played for Third Lanark, Airdrieonians, Hearts, Toronto Blizzard and Morton. Busby also served Queen of the South as their player-manager.

Career
Busby started his senior career at Third Lanark, but the club went out of business in 1967 at the end of his first season. Drew scored Thirds' last goal in a 5–1 defeat at Boghead against Dumbarton on 28 April. Without a club, he dropped down to Junior level for three seasons, playing for his local side Vale of Leven.

Busby returned to the senior game in 1970 with Airdrieonians. Known for his robust style of play, he formed a formidable attacking partnership with Drew Jarvie and scored 43 goals in 93 league games. With Airdrie facing relegation in 1973, Hearts manager Bobby Seith stepped in to sign Busby for a fee of £35,000. In six seasons at Tynecastle, Busby scored 84 goals in all competitions, played in the 1976 Scottish Cup Final and was popular with the Hearts support. Relegation for the second time in three seasons however forced the club to cut costs and Busby was released at the end of the 1978–79 campaign.

Following two seasons in the NASL with the nascent Toronto Blizzard, Busby returned to Scotland and joined Morton (scoring on his league debut for the Greenock club) before becoming player-manager of Dumfries club Queen of the South in 1982. After two seasons with little success, Busby retired in 1984. Former players, Ted McMinn, Jimmy Robertson and George Cloy have all subsequently been interviewed by the club and spoken well of Busby. Crawford Boyd cited a difference of opinion with Busby as being behind his own departure from Queens.

Busby was the landlord of the Waverley Bar in Dumbarton. He published an autobiography in July 2013, "The Drew Busby Story". In May 2014 he was inducted into the Airdrieonians Hall Of Fame at the annual Player Of The Year Award Dinner.

Busby died on 1 July 2022, at the age of 74.

References

External links

Article from The Scotsman, November 2012

1947 births
2022 deaths
Footballers from Glasgow
Scottish footballers
Third Lanark A.C. players
Vale of Leven F.C. players
Airdrieonians F.C. (1878) players
Heart of Midlothian F.C. players
Queen of the South F.C. players
Greenock Morton F.C. players
Scottish Football League players
Scottish expatriate footballers
Scottish expatriate sportspeople in Canada
Toronto Blizzard (1971–1984) players
Association football forwards
Scottish football managers
Queen of the South F.C. managers
Scottish Junior Football Association players
Scottish Football League managers
North American Soccer League (1968–1984) players